The Pedro Echevarria House at 5605 W. State Street in  Garden City, Idaho, is a brick and wood frame Bungalow designed by Tourtellotte and Hummel and constructed in 1920 for Pedro and Maria Echevarria. The house was listed on the National Register of Historic Places in 1982.

In 2018 a developer proposed building 19 small houses on the site, preserving the Pedro Echevarria House as the community center of a cohousing neighborhood, but the City rejected the proposal as "incompatible with the city's comprehensive plan."

Pedro Echevarria
Pedro Echevarria (June 5, 1881-July 22, 1953) was an immigrant from Spain who moved to the Boise area in 1901 and later operated the Big Creek Sheep Co.

Echevarria became a naturalized citizen of the United States in 1909.

References

External links
 
 Basque Museum, Boise

		
National Register of Historic Places in Ada County, Idaho
Houses completed in 1920
Buildings and structures in Ada County, Idaho